Kapısuyu is a village in Samandağı district of Hatay Province, Turkey. The population of the village was 1799  as of 2012. The village was an important settlement in the ancient ages. Around 300 BC Seleucia founded the port city of Seleucia Pieria. But the settlement lost its importance after the great earthquake in 528. The village's most important building is its Mosque. The name of the village means "Water gate" or "gate of water".

References

Villages in Hatay Province
Samandağ District
Populated coastal places in Turkey